The 2010 Espirito Santo Trophy took place 20–23 October at the Olivos Golf Club and Buenos Aires Golf Club in Buenos Aires, Argentina. 

It was the 24th women's golf World Amateur Team Championship for the Espirito Santo Trophy.

The tournament was a 72-hole stroke play team event. There were a record 52 team entries, each with two or three players.

Each team played two rounds at Olivos and two rounds at Buenos Aires. The best two scores for each round counted towards the team total.

South Korea won the Trophy for their second title, with a record 30-under-par score of 546, 17 strokes ahead of silver medalist team United States. Defending champion team Sweden shared the bronze medal with France and South Africa on third place, another five strokes back.

The individual leaderboard was headed by the three South Korean players, with Han Jung-eun on top, scoring 275, 13 under par. The third South Korean player was individually five strokes ahead of the best player of any other team. If the South Korean team would have been forced to count the two worst scores in each round, they would still have won the team competition with five strokes.

Chloé Leurquin, Belgium, made a hole-in-one in the fourth round on the 7th hole at Olivos Golf Club from 162 yards.

Teams 
52 teams entered the event and completed the competition. Each team had three players, except team Tanzania, which only had two.

Results 

Source:

Individual leaders 
There was no official recognition for the lowest individual scores.

References

External link 
World Amateur Team Championships on International Golf Federation website

Espirito Santo Trophy
Golf tournaments in Argentina
Espirito Santo Trophy
Espirito Santo Trophy
Espirito Santo Trophy